Miss Réunion is a French beauty pageant which selects a representative for the Miss France national competition from the overseas region  of Réunion. The competition was first held in 1957, but was not organized regularly until 1974.

The current Miss Réunion is Marion Marimoutou, who was crowned Miss Réunion 2022 on 27 August 2022. Two women from Réunion have been crowned Miss France:
Monique Uldaric, who was crowned Miss France 1976
Valérie Bègue, who was crowned Miss France 2008

Results summary
Miss France: Monique Uldaric (1975); Valérie Bègue (2007)
1st Runner-Up: Joëlle Ramyead (1986)
2nd Runner-Up: Évelyne Pongérard (1976); Kelly Hoarau (1977); Isabelle Jacquemart (1978); Corine Lauret (1994); Raïssa Boyer (2006); Marie Payet (2011)
3rd Runner-Up: Myrose Hoareau (1979); Élodie Lebon (2005); Morgane Soucramanien (2018)
4th Runner-Up: Élodie Surray (1999); Azuima Issa (2015); Audrey Chane Pao Kan (2017)
5th Runner-Up: Virginie Benoîte (2004); Ambre Nguyen (2016); Lyna Boyer (2020)
6th Runner-Up: Raïssa Law Wan (2001); Dana Virin (2021)
Top 12/Top 15: Bernadette Orboin (1974); Brigitte Adam (1991); Delphine Courteaud (2008); Vanille M'Doihoma (2013); Marie-Morgane Lebon (2019)

Titleholders

Notes

References

External links

Miss France regional pageants
Beauty pageants in France
Women in Réunion